Chase the Ace can refer to:

Chase the Ace (card game), another name for Ranter-Go-Round
"Chase the Ace" (song), an instrumental rock song by AC/DC
Chase the Ace (lottery)
Chase the Ace (play), a 1935 British play by Anthony Kimmins